The 1968 All-SEC football team consists of American football players selected to the All-Southeastern Conference (SEC) chosen by various selectors for the 1968 NCAA University Division football season. Georgia won the conference.

Offensive selections

Receivers 

 Tim Christian, Auburn (AP-1, UPI)
Sammy Milner, Miss. St. (AP-1, UPI)
 Donnie Sutton, Alabama (AP-2)
Kent Lawrence, Georgia (AP-2)

Tight ends 
Ken DeLong, Tennessee (AP-2, UPI)
 Dennis Hughes, Georgia (AP-1)

Tackles 

David Rholetter, Georgia (AP-1, UPI)
 Bill Fortier, LSU (AP-1, UPI)
Bob Asher, Vanderbilt (AP-2)
Jerry Gordon, Auburn (AP-2)

Guards 
Charles Rosenfelder, Tennessee (AP-1, UPI)
Guy Dennis, Florida (AP-2, UPI)
 Al Samples, Alabama (AP-1)
Johnny McDonald, Auburn (AP-2)

Centers 

 Chip Kell, Tennessee (College Football Hall of Fame)  (AP-1)
Tom Banks, Auburn (UPI)
Godfrey Zaunbrecher, LSU (AP-2)

Quarterbacks 

 Tommy Pharr, Miss. St. (AP-1)
Loran Carter, Auburn (UPI)
Mike Cavan, Georgia (AP-2)

Running backs 

 Dicky Lyons, Kentucky  (AP-1, UPI)
Larry Smith, Florida (AP-2, UPI)
 Richard Pickens, Tennessee (AP-1)
Richmond Flowers, Tennessee (AP-2)

Defensive selections

Ends 

 Billy Payne, Georgia  (AP-1, UPI)
 Mike Ford, Alabama (AP-1, UPI)
 Neal McMeans, Tennessee (AP-2)
Dick Palmer, Kentucky (AP-2)

Tackles 

 Bill Stanfill, Georgia (College Football Hall of Fame)  (AP-1, UPI)
 David Campbell, Auburn  (AP-1, UPI)
Dick Williams, Tennessee (AP-2)
Randy Barron, Alabama (AP-2)

Middle guard 

 Sammy Gellerstedt, Auburn  (AP-1, UPI)
David Roller, Kentucky (AP-2)

Linebackers 

 Steve Kiner, Tennessee (College Football Hall of Fame)  (AP-1, UPI)
Mike Hall, Alabama (AP-1, UPI)
 Mike Kolen, Auburn  (AP-1, UPI)
Mike Anderson, LSU (AP-2)
Frank Trapp, Mississippi (AP-2)
Happy Dicks, Georgia (AP-2)

Backs 

 Jake Scott, Georgia (College Football Hall of Fame)  (AP-1, UPI)
Steve Tannen, Florida (AP-2, UPI)
Jim Weatherford, Tennessee (AP-2, UPI)
 Buddy McClinton, Auburn  (AP-1)
 Glenn Cannon, Mississippi (AP-1)
Gerry Kent, LSU (AP-2)

Special teams

Kicker 

 John Riley, Auburn (AP-1)
Jim McCullough, Georgia (AP-2)

Punter 

 Spike Jones, Georgia (AP-1)
Julian Fagan, Mississippi (AP-2)

Key

AP = Associated Press.

UPI = United Press International.

Bold = Consensus first-team selection by both AP and UPI

See also
1968 College Football All-America Team

References

All-SEC
All-SEC football teams